The Hereke Tunnel, is a motorway tunnel constructed on the Istanbul–Ankara motorway   in Kocaeli Province, northwestern Turkey. It was opened to traffic in 1984.

It is situated in Körfez district of Kocaeli Province.

The tunnel was constructed in the 1980s. During the 1999 İzmit earthquake, the tunnel was light damaged. In 2012, the tunnel's both tubes were reinforced. In the time period of 2013–2014, the tunnel was modernized for traffic safety. Around 55,000 vehicles pass through the tunnel in both directions daily.

See also
 List of motorway tunnels in Turkey

References

External links
 Map of road tunnels in Turkey  at General Directorate of Highways (Turkey) (KGM)

Road tunnels in Turkey
Transport in Kocaeli Province
İzmit